Heinrich Zell (died after 1560) was a German printer and cartographer. He was a student of Sebastian Münster.

Accompanying Rheticus to Prussia, Heinrich Zell in collaboration with Nicolaus Copernicus, produced the first geostatic map of the Prussian coastline and had the first printed map of Prussia with hundreds of towns printed in 1542. Zell incorporated Ermland (Warmia) records of Prussian towns in this detailed and until then unaccomplished task.

Works 
 Heinrich Zell, Prussiae descriptio, Coloniae, 1594, Staatsbibliothek Preussischer Kulturbesitz, Berlin (printed after the original from 1542 in the St. Mark's Library in Venice)
 printed map of Brandenburg, 1550

External links 

 http://lazarus.elte.hu/gb/imcos97/scharfe1.htm 
 https://web.archive.org/web/20050330211134/http://marebalticum.natmus.dk/lokUK.asp?ID=5
 http://www.orteliusmaps.com/book/ort88.html

1560 deaths
German cartographers
German printers
Year of birth unknown